Solli is a Norwegian surname that may refer to
Arne Solli (1938–2017), Norwegian Army general and Chief of Defence of Norway
Bjarne Daniel Solli (1910–1989), Norwegian politician
Bjørn Vidar Solli (born 1979), Norwegian jazz musician and composer
Brit Solli (born 1959), Norwegian archaeologist 
Didrik Solli-Tangen (born 1987), Norwegian singer
Emil Solli-Tangen (born 1991), Norwegian opera singer, brother of Didrik
Guro Strøm Solli (born 1983), Norwegian cross-country skier
Inge Solli (born 1959), Norwegian politician
Jan Gunnar Solli (born 1981), Norwegian footballer
Kristin Solli Schøien (born 1954), Norwegian author and composer
Lavrans Solli (born 1992), Norwegian swimmer
Lena Solli-Reimann (born 1969), Norwegian hurdler
Odd Solli (1924–2007), Norwegian bobsledder
Sivert Solli (born 1997), Norwegian footballer

Norwegian-language surnames